Cook or The Cook may refer to:

Food preparation
 Cooking, the preparation of food
 Cook (domestic worker), a household staff member who prepares food
 Cook (professional), an individual who prepares food for consumption in the food industry
 Chef, a professional proficient in all aspects of food preparation

Geography

U.S.
 Cook, Minnesota, a city
 Cook, Nebraska, a village
 Cook, Ohio, an unincorporated community
 Cook Hill (disambiguation)
 Cook Hollow, Oregon County, Missouri
 Cook Inlet, off the Gulf of Alaska

Australia
 Cook, South Australia
 Cook County, New South Wales
 Cook, Australian Capital Territory

Elsewhere
 Cook Peninsula, Nunavut, Canada
 Cook Strait, the strait separating the North and South Islands of New Zealand

Companies
 Cook Group, an American manufacturer of medical devices
 Cook Records, an American record label
 Cook Trading, a UK manufacturer and retailer of frozen ready meals
 Thomas Cook Group, a defunct British travel company

Film
 The Cook, a 1917 animated Krazy Kat film
 The Cook (1918 film), an American comedy film by Fatty Arbuckle, with Buster Keaton
 The Cook (1965 film), a Soviet comedy film

Other
 Cook (crater), a crater on Earth's Moon
 Cook (dog) (2000–2016), a Spanish dog actor
 Cook (surname)
 Cook codec, a lossy audio compression codec developed by RealNetworks
 USS Cook, two ships of the U.S. Navy
 The Cook (Arcimboldo), a c. 1570 painting by Giuseppe Arcimboldo
 Division of Cook, an Australian House of Representatives electoral district
 Electoral district of Cook, a Queensland Legislative Assembly electoral district

See also 
 "La Cuisinière" (lit. "The Cook"), a 1930 song by Mary Bolduc
 Cooke (disambiguation)
 Cooked (disambiguation)
 Cook County (disambiguation)
 Cook Glacier (disambiguation)
 Cook Island (disambiguation)
 Cook Islands (disambiguation)
 Cook River (disambiguation)
 Cook Township (disambiguation)